The 1992 European Junior Swimming Championships were held from 13–18 August 1992 in Leeds, Great Britain.

Medal table

Medal summary

Boy's events

|-
| 100 m freestyle

|-
| 200 m freestyle

|-
| 400 m freestyle

|-
| 1500 m freestyle

|-
| 100 m backstroke

|-
| 200 m backstroke

|-
| 100 m breaststroke

|-
| 200 m breaststroke

|-
| 100 m butterfly

|-
| 200 m butterfly

|-
| 200 m individual medley

|-
| 400 m individual medley

|-
|  freestyle relay

|-
|  freestyle relay

|-
|  medley relay

|}

Girl's events

|-
| 100 m freestyle

|valign=top|Gyöngyvér LakosAnja Kleber
|valign=top align=right|58.99 

|-
| 200 m freestyle

|-
| 400 m freestyle

|-
| 800 m freestyle

|-
| 100 m backstroke

|-
| 200 m backstroke

|-
| 100 m breaststroke

|-
| 200 m breaststroke

|-
| 100 m butterfly

|-
| 200 m butterfly

|-
| 200 m individual medley

|-
| 400 m individual medley

|-
|  freestyle relay

|-
|  freestyle relay

|-
|  medley relay

|}

J
S
European Junior Swimming Championships
S 
International aquatics competitions hosted by the United Kingdom 
1990s in Leeds
Sports competitions in Leeds
Swimming
August 1992 sports events in the United Kingdom